Chandrakant Khaire (born 1 January 1952) is an Indian politician. He is a member of the Shiv Sena political party from Aurangabad. He was elected consecutively for 4 terms in Lok Sabha representing Auragabad for 1999, 2004, 2009 and 2014. He was two time MLA from Aurangabad West in 1990 and 1995. He had also served as cabinet minister in Maharashtra state government from 1995 to 1999 in the Shiv Sena Government.

Personal life
Khaire was born on 1 January 1952 to Bhaurao and Vatsala Khaire in Aurangabad. He completed his Diploma in Personnel Management from Marathwada University. Khaire married Kasturi Choudhari 5 January 1975, with whom he has two sons and two daughters. He is also an industrialist and trade unionist by profession besides being a politician and social worker.

Positions held
 1985 : Founder Member, Shiv Sena Party, Marathwada
 1988 : Corporator, Municipal Corporation, Gulmandi Ward, Aurangabad
 1988-90 : Leader of the Opposition, Municipal Corporation, Aurangabad
 1990-99 : Member, Maharashtra Legislative Assembly (two terms)
 1992-95 : Member, Estimates Committee, Maharashtra Legislative Assembly
 1992-1995 : Sampark Pramukh, Shiv Sena Party, Aurangabad
 1995-1997 : Cabinet Minister, Housing, Slum Improvement and Urban Land Ceiling, Maharashtra
 1997-1998 : Cabinet Minister, Transport, Maharashtra
 1998-1999 : Cabinet Minister, Environment, Maharashtra
 1995-1999 : Guardian Minister, District Aurangabad
 1999 : Elected to 13th Lok Sabha (1st term)
 2002-2004 : Leader, Shiv Sena Parliamentary Party (Lok Sabha)
 2004 : Elected to 14th Lok Sabha (2nd term)
 2005 onwards Deputy Leader, Shiv Sena
 2009 : Elected to 15th Lok Sabha (3rd term)
 2014 : Elected to 16th Lok Sabha (4th term)
2018: Appointed as standing committee member of Employees state insurance corporation (ESIC)
 2018 : Appointed as Leader of Shiv Sena Party

See also
 List of members of the 16th Lok Sabha
 List of members of the 15th Lok Sabha
 List of members of the 14th Lok Sabha
 13th Lok Sabha
 Aurangabad West (Vidhan Sabha constituency)
 Manohar Joshi ministry (1995–99)
 Narayan Rane ministry

References

External links
 Official website
 Shivsena Home Page
 National Portal of India
 Official biographical sketch in Parliament of India website

Living people
1952 births
India MPs 1999–2004
India MPs 2004–2009
India MPs 2009–2014
Dr. Babasaheb Ambedkar Marathwada University alumni
People from Aurangabad, Maharashtra
Shiv Sena politicians
Lok Sabha members from Maharashtra
India MPs 2014–2019
State cabinet ministers of Maharashtra
Maharashtra MLAs 1990–1995
Maharashtra MLAs 1995–1999